"Examination Day" is the first segment of the sixth episode from the first season (1985–86) of the television series The Twilight Zone. The segment is based on the short story "Examination Day" by Henry Slesar. The story was first published in Playboy (February 1958).

Plot 
Dickie Jordan is an intelligent and curious youth. He and his family live in a dystopian future. On Dickie's twelfth birthday, he is required by law to undergo an intelligence examination. Dickie's birthday wish is to do well on his exam. As Dickie gleefully tells his parents how he was told by an older friend that the test is easy and that he's sure he will pass it, his parents appear stressed and avoid his questions. When the time comes, they bring him to a government testing facility. There he is given a serum to ensure he tells the truth and given a series of intelligence assessment questions.

After the test is complete, Dickie's parents are contacted by the government and told that Dickie's intelligence exceeded the legal limit and so he was executed. The parents burst into tears as the government examiners ask them how they would like to handle their son's remains: whether his body should be interred by the government, or if they would prefer a private burial.

Reception 
The Evening Independent wrote that the episode was "a bit predictable, but the reason for the tragic climax was a shock".

References

External links 
 

1985 American television episodes
The Twilight Zone (1985 TV series season 1) episodes
Dystopian television episodes
Television shows based on short fiction

fr:QI mortel